Senator Cary may refer to:

Archibald Cary (1721–1787), Virginia State Senate
John W. Cary (1817–1895), Wisconsin State Senate
Luther H. Cary (1824–1888), Wisconsin State Senate
Shepard Cary (1805–1866), Maine State Senate
Trumbull Cary (1787–1869), New York State Senate

See also
Senator Carey (disambiguation)